The Arizona State Railroad Museum Foundation (ASRM) is a non-profit organization that primarily preserves historic railroad equipment that was once used throughout the state of Arizona. It was founded in 2009, and it is located in Williams, Arizona alongside the Grand Canyon Railway. Their goal is to construct a 21-acre museum to attract a world-wide audience with a  collection of locomotives, rolling stock, and other historic artifacts.

About the museum 
The Arizona State Railroad Museum was founded in 2009 by a group of people with the intention of establishing heritage for the city of Williams' economy. The foundation's chairman and CEO is Albert J Richmond, and their director and secretary is Donald Dent. The foundation's goal is to construct a twenty-one acre museum ground adjacent to the Grand Canyon Railway's trackage near Interstate Highway 40. The museum is planned to display multiple locomotives, passenger cars, freight cars, and other railroad artifacts that represent railroad history in the state of Arizona.

Equipment

See also 

 Grand Canyon Railway – the ASRM's neighboring railroad.
 Arizona Railway Museum
 Nevada State Railroad Museum
 Colorado Railroad Museum

References

External links 
Arizona State Railroad Museum Home Page

2009 establishments in Arizona
Heritage railroads in Arizona
Museums in Coconino County, Arizona
Transportation museums in Arizona